Adam Hassan Sakak(born 13 January 1965) is a former Sudanese sprinter who competed in the men's 100m competition at the 1992 Summer Olympics. He recorded an 11.12, not enough to qualify for the next round past the heats. His personal best is 10.79, set in 1992. He also competed in the 200m race, recording a 21.96.

References

1965 births
Living people
Place of birth missing (living people)
Sudanese male sprinters
Athletes (track and field) at the 1992 Summer Olympics
Olympic athletes of Sudan